Mačkovo Selo is a village in central Croatia, in the Town of Petrinja, Sisak-Moslavina County. It is connected by the D30 highway.

Demographics
According to the 2011 census, the village of Mačkovo Selo has 36 inhabitants. This represents 19.57% of its pre-war population according to the 1991 census.

Note: Data for years 1910-1931 also includes data for the village of Miočinovići.

References

Populated places in Sisak-Moslavina County
Serb communities in Croatia